Om Prakash Rajbhar (born 15 September 1962) is an Indian politician and president of the Suheldev Bharatiya Samaj Party (SBSP). He is a member of 18th Legislative Assembly from Zahoorabad constituency of Uttar Pradesh.

Early life
Rajbhar was born to Sannu Rajbhar in katauna village, pindra block, Varanasi district, Uttar Pradesh. He graduated from Baldev Degree College, Badagaon, Varanasi in 1983. He is an agriculturalist by profession.

Political career
Rajbhar is a member of the 18th Legislative Assembly of Uttar Pradesh. Since 2017, he has represented the Zahoorabad in Ghazipur.

On 19 March 2017, Rajbhar became a cabinet minister in the Yogi Adityanath ministry as the minister of the Department of Backward Classes Welfare and the Department of Disabled People development.

On 20 May 2019, Rajbhar was sacked from Uttar Pradesh Cabinet citing anti-alliance activities.

In October 2021, Rajbhar announced that his party will form an alliance with Samajwadi Party for the 2022 Uttar Pradesh Legislative Assembly election.

In 2022 Uttar Pradesh Legislative Assembly election working in alliance with SP, SBSP contested in 17 seats in UP and won 6 seats along with party leader Om Prakash Rajbhar.

Views
In a 2022 interview with The Wire, Rajbhar said he is not a Hindu, and will not join NDA. He questioned whether the construction of the Ram Mandir would get the poor and backward children educated. He also asked BJP to focus more on schools and education rather than mandirs.

Posts held

See also
Uttar Pradesh Legislative Assembly

References

Uttar Pradesh MLAs 2017–2022
Bahujan Samaj Party politicians from Uttar Pradesh
Suheldev Bhartiya Samaj Party politicians
Living people
State cabinet ministers of Uttar Pradesh
Yogi ministry
1962 births